The 1975 ABA Playoffs was the postseason tournament of the American Basketball Association's 1974–75 season. The tournament concluded with the Eastern Division champion Kentucky Colonels defeating the Western Division champion Indiana Pacers, four games to one in the ABA Finals.

The Kentucky Colonels won 22 of their final 25 regular season games to catch the New York Nets for a share of first place in the Eastern Division. The Colonels won their last ten regular season games. They also went 13–3 in the ABA playoffs.

Because the Colonels and Nets tied for first place in the Eastern Division, a special one game playoff was played to determine the conference champion. The Colonels hosted the game and defeated the Nets 108–99 on April 4, 1975.

The Memphis Sounds' Eastern Division 111–99 semifinal loss on the road to the Kentucky Colonels on April 13, 1975, was the final game played by the Sounds. After the season they moved to Maryland and became the Baltimore Claws.

The first round win by the Spirits of St. Louis over the New York Nets was the biggest upset of the playoffs. Not only had the Spirits finished 26 games behind the Nets in the regular season, they had also lost all 11 regular season matchups to the Nets, and by an average of 17.3 points per game. But after losing the opener of the series to stretch the losing streak to 12, the Spirits rolled off four wins in a row to claim the series.

The 1975 ABA Finals marked the second time in three years that the Kentucky Colonels and Indiana Pacers met in the ABA championship series. The Pacers edged the Colonels 4 games to 3 at the end of the 1973 ABA Playoffs.

16,622 fans attended the final playoff game of the season in Freedom Hall in Louisville, Kentucky, as the Kentucky Colonels defeated the Indiana Pacers 110–105 to win the ABA Championship.

Artis Gilmore was named Most Valuable Player of the 1975 ABA Playoffs. Gilmore scored 28 points and grabbed 31 rebounds in the final game of the Finals and in Game 3 in Indianapolis Gilmore scored 41 points and nabbed 28 rebounds.

The 1975 Kentucky Colonels were the final team to win an ABA Championship but not move on to the NBA later.

Bracket

Western Division
Champion: Indiana Pacers

Division Semifinals
(1) Denver Nuggets vs. (4) Utah Stars:
Nuggets win series 4–2
Game 1 @ Denver: Denver 122, Utah 107
Game 2 @ Denver: Denver 126, Utah 120
Game 3 @ Utah: Utah 122, Denver 108
Game 4 @ Utah: Utah 132, Denver 110
Game 5 @ Denver: Denver 130, Utah 119
Game 6 @ Utah: Denver 115, Utah 113

(2) San Antonio Spurs vs. (3) Indiana Pacers:
Pacers win series 4–2
Game 1 @ San Antonio: Indiana 122, San Antonio 119
Game 2 @ San Antonio: Indiana 98, San Antonio 93
Game 3 @ Indiana: Indiana 113, San Antonio 103
Game 4 @ Indiana: San Antonio 110, Indiana 109
Game 5 @ San Antonio: San Antonio 123, Indiana 117
Game 6 @ Indiana: Indiana 115, San Antonio 100

Division Finals
(1) Denver Nuggets vs. (3) Indiana Pacers:
Pacers win series 4–3
Game 1 @ Denver: Denver 131, Indiana 128
Game 2 @ Denver: Indiana 131, Denver 124
Game 3 @ Indiana: Indiana 118, Denver 112
Game 4 @ Indiana: Denver 126, Indiana 109
Game 5 @ Denver: Indiana 109, Denver 90
Game 6 @ Indiana: Denver 104, Indiana 99
Game 7 @ Denver: Indiana 104, Denver 96

Eastern Division
Champion: Kentucky Colonels

Division Semifinals
(1) Kentucky Colonels vs. (4) Memphis Sounds:
Colonels win series 4–1
Game 1 @ Kentucky: Kentucky 98, Memphis 91
Game 2 @ Kentucky: Kentucky 119, Memphis 105
Game 3 @ Memphis: Kentucky 101, Memphis 80
Game 4 @ Memphis: Memphis 107, Kentucky 93
Game 5 @ Kentucky:  Kentucky 111, Memphis 99

(2) New York Nets vs. (3) Spirits of St. Louis:
Spirits win series 4–1
Game 1 @ New York: New York 111, St. Louis 105
Game 2 @ New York: St. Louis 115, New York 97
Game 3 @ St. Louis: St. Louis 113, New York 108
Game 4 @ St. Louis: St. Louis 100, New York 89
Game 5 @ New York: St. Louis 108, New York 107

Division Finals
(1) Kentucky Colonels vs. (3) Spirits of St. Louis:
Colonels win series 4–1
Game 1 @ Kentucky: Kentucky 112, St. Louis 109
Game 2 @ Kentucky: Kentucky 108, St. Louis 103
Game 3 @ St. Louis: St. Louis 103, Kentucky 97
Game 4 @ St. Louis: Kentucky 117, St. Louis 98
Game 5 @ Kentucky: Kentucky 123, St. Louis 103

ABA Finals
(1) Kentucky Colonels VS. (3) Indiana Pacers:
Colonels win series 4–1
Game 1 (May 13) @ Louisville: Kentucky 120, Indiana 94
Game 2 (May 15) @ Louisville: Kentucky 95, Indiana 93
Game 3 (May 18) @ Indianapolis: Kentucky 109, Indiana 101
Game 4 (May 19) @ Indianapolis: Indiana 94, Kentucky 86
Game 5 (May 22) @ Louisville: Kentucky 110, Indiana 105

References

External links
RememberTheABA.com page on 1975 ABA playoffs 
Basketball-Reference.com's 1975 ABA Playoffs page
RememberTheABA.com page on 1975 ABA playoff series between the Denver Nuggets and Indiana Pacers

Playoffs
American Basketball Association playoffs
Basketball competitions in Louisville, Kentucky
Basketball competitions in Indianapolis
ABA